Tagakolga is a settlement in Rõuge Parish, Võru County, Estonia.

References

Villages in Võru County